Star Wars: Battlefront is a video game series in the Star Wars franchise.

Star Wars: Battlefront may also refer to:

 Star Wars: Battlefront (2004 video game), the first game in the series
 Star Wars Battlefront (2015 video game), a reboot of the first Battlefront game